The Mongolia national football team represents Mongolia in international football under the control of the Mongolian Football Federation (MFF). Founded in 1959, the federation was inactive between 1961 and 1997 and the men's national team did not feature in any international fixtures during that time. The federation was reorganised in 1997 and joined the AFC the same year. In 1998 the federation became a full member of FIFA, the international governing body for the sport. The MFF joined the EAFF as one of eight founding members in May 2002. Because of the harsh climate and a lack of suitable venues, the team has hosted few home matches in the past. However, in 2002 the MFF, with assistance from FIFA, began developing facilities in the country, including the creation of the 5,000-seat MFF Football Centre, which will allow the team to play more matches in Mongolia. About Mongolia's relatively low number of matches played, former national team player and coach Zorigtyn Battulga said, "Lack of games is a problem. No one will come to Mongolia in December and for us to fly to other countries is very expensive so it’s hard to arrange official matches."

After the MFF was formed, the men's national team competed in a tournament in Hanoi, North Vietnam which included the national teams of only communist states in Asia. Mongolia competed against China, North Korea, and North Vietnam, losing all three matches by a combined score of 3 to 19. Mongolia competed at the East Asian Games in 1993, 1997, and 2001. Although the tournament was meant to be competed among under-23 teams, Mongolia, Guam, and Macau were permitted to enter their full national teams in 2001. Some evidence suggests that Mongolia was also permitted to enter its full national team in 1993 also but sources indicate that only North Korea fielded a team without age restrictions. If the full national team competed in 1993, they recorded the team's first ever victory, either before or after FIFA membership, with a 4–3 win over Macau on 18 May.

The Mongolia national team has historically competed only in official competitions such as the EAFF East Asian Championship, AFC Asian Cup qualification, and FIFA World Cup qualification since becoming members of FIFA. The MFF was suspended by the EAFF from January 2011 to March 2014 and was therefore unable to compete in the 2013 EAFF East Asian Cup. Between February 2000 and October 2017, the team played only one FIFA international friendly. The match was a 1–8 defeat to Uzbekistan in Tashkent on 28 February 2000. The team's first official goal was scored in the match by Tsagaantsooj Enkhtur since Mongolia failed to score in its two matches at the 1998 Asian Games. Mongolia did not play its second international friendly until 5 October 2017, a nearly 18-year break between the team's first and second matches. The match ended in a 2–4 defeat to Chinese Taipei. After arranging another friendly in March 2018, this time against Malaysia in Kuala Lumpur which resulted in the team's first non-loss in a friendly, the team took on Mauritius at the MFF Football Centre in Ulaanbaatar for the team's first-ever home friendly and first time playing a non-AFC member.

Mongolia recorded its first-ever FIFA victory on 24 February 2003 with a 2–0 result over Guam during the 2003 East Asian Football Championship. The team earned its second victory during 2004 AFC Asian Cup qualification by a score of 5–0 over the same opponent. That 5–0 scoreline remained Mongolia's largest margin of victory until July 2016 when the team beat the Northern Mariana Islands 8–0 during the 2017 EAFF East Asian Cup. The team broke its own record again in 2018 with a 9–0 victory over the same opponent. Mongolia suffered one of its largest defeats in an official match with a 0–12 result against the Maldives during 2006 FIFA World Cup qualification. Mongolia's senior men's team lost 0–15 to Uzbekistan during the 1998 Asian Games, the team's largest-ever margin of defeat.

Key

Pre-FIFA results

1960 Communist Tournament

FIFA results

Friendlies

1998 Asian Games

2000 AFC Asian Cup qualifying

2001 East Asian Games

2002 FIFA World Cup qualifying

2003 East Asian Football Championship

2004 AFC Asian Cup qualifying

2006 FIFA World qualifying

2005 East Asian Football Championship

2008 East Asian Football Championship

2010 FIFA World Cup qualifying

2010 East Asian Football Championship

2010 AFC Challenge Cup qualifying

2012 AFC Challenge Cup qualifying

2014 FIFA World Cup qualifying

2014 AFC Challenge Cup qualifying

2015 EAFF East Asian Cup

2018 FIFA World Cup qualifying 

Timor-Leste won the first leg 4–1 and the second leg 1–0, thus winning 5–1 on aggregate and advancing to the Second Round. On 12 December 2017, FIFA awarded both matches 3–0 to Mongolia due to Timor-Leste fielding a total of nine ineligible players based on nationality. However, this was long after the Second Round had been played so Timor-Leste advanced and Mongolia were not reinstated.

2017 EAFF East Asian Cup

2016 AFC Solidarity Cup 

In April 2016, it was announced that Mongolia would participate in the inaugural AFC Solidarity Cup, a tournament for the confederation's lowest ranked teams who have limited opportunities to arrange friendly matches, in November 2016. The tournament would replace the defunct AFC Challenge Cup. Each team was expected to participate in a minimum of three matches. Mongolia was drawn into Group B alongside Sri Lanka, Macau, and Laos. At the time of the draw, it was announced that the tournament would be held in Malaysia. As part of preparation for the tournament, Mongolia played a friendly match against Hebei China Fortune, a club team from the Chinese Super League, during the team's training camp in China. The match ended in a 0–2 defeat. Mongolia did not advance beyond the group stage after finishing third in Group B. The team recorded a defeat to Macau and a win over Sri Lanka but was defeated by Laos in the team's final match, a match from which they needed at least a draw to advance. Mongolia's manager for the tournament was Toshiaki Imai of Japan.

2019 EAFF E-1 Championship

First Preliminary Round
It was announced at the EAFF Annual Meeting in March 2018 that Mongolia would host Round 1 of qualification for the East Asian Football Championship. It would be the nation's first time hosting matches in any round of the tournament. After comfortable wins in its first two matches, Mongolia needed only a single point against Guam on the final matchday to secure a place in the second round of the tournament for the first time ever. After a scoreless first half, Guam took the lead in the 89th minute. However, in the fourth minute of stoppage time a Norjmoo Tsedenbal strike rescued a point for Mongolia which was enough for the team to earn the top spot in the group and advance. Mongolia's 9–0 result over the Northern Mariana Islands set a new team record for largest margin of victory, topping the previous record of 8–0 the team set against the same opponent in 2016.

Second Preliminary Round

2022 FIFA World Cup qualifying

On 17 April 2019 it was decided by a draw held in Kuala Lumpur, Malaysia that Mongolia would face Brunei in the First Round of qualification for the 2022 FIFA World Cup. The winner of the home-and-away series would advance to Round 2 which was set to begin in September 2019. The first two rounds of qualification would also serve as the preliminary stages of 2023 AFC Asian Cup qualification. The fixture date and kickoff time for the team's first leg against Brunei ensured that Mongolia would play the first qualification match worldwide for the second consecutive tournament. Mongolia won the first leg 2–0 at home with Tsedenbal Norjmoo scoring the first goal of 2022 FIFA World Cup qualification with a 9th-minute free kick strike. Before this victory, Mongolia had only ever recorded a single victory in FIFA World Cup qualification. Despite losing the return leg in Brunei 1–2, Mongolia progressed to round two of World Cup qualification for the first time ever with an aggregate score of 3–2.

First round

Second round

Mongolia learned its group for the second round at the draw held on 17 July 2019 in Doha, Qatar. They were drawn into Group F alongside Japan, Myanmar, Tajikistan, and Kyrgyzstan. Mongolia advanced to the next round of 2023 AFC Asian Cup qualification following a victory against Kyrgyzstan in Mongolia's final match of the second round, despite being eliminated from World Cup qualification.

2023 AFC Asian Cup qualification

All-time record 
Key

 Pld = Matches played
 W = Matches won
 D = Matches drawn
 L = Matches lost

 GF = Goals for
 GA = Goals against
 GD = Goal differential
 Countries are listed in alphabetical order

As of 14 June 2022

^ Include

References

External links
 FIFA list of matches
 ELO list of matches
 RSSSF list of matches
 Mongolian Football Central

results